Hasan Hüseyin Kaçar (born July 11, 1988) is a Turkish middle and long distance runner competing in the T11 class.

Hasan Hüseyin Kaçar began his sporting career in 2006. He competes for Çankaya Belediyesi SK in Ankara.

Kaçar competed at the 2013 IPC Athletics World Championships held in Lyon, France, and won the bronze medal in the 800m T11 event.

In 2013, he took the bronze medal in the 800m T11 event at the 2013 IPC Athletics World Championships in Lyon, France. In 2015, he took the bronze medal in the 1500m T11 event at the 2015 IPC Athletics World Championships in Doha, Qatar.

Kaçar captured the silver medal in the 5000m T11 event at the 2014 IPC Athletics European Championships in Swansea, Wales, UK.

In 2016, he took the gold medal in the 5000m T11 event and he won the silver medal in the 1500m T11 event at the 2016 IPC Athletics European Championships in Grosseto, Italy.

He represented his country at the 2016 Paralympics in Rio de Janeiro, Brazil competing in the 1500m T11 and 5000m T11 events. He finished fourth place in the 5000m T11 event at the 2016 Paralympics in Rio de Janeiro, Brazil.

References

1988 births
Living people
Male competitors in athletics with disabilities
Visually impaired middle-distance runners
Turkish male middle-distance runners
Turkish male long-distance runners
Paralympic athletes of Turkey
Athletes (track and field) at the 2016 Summer Paralympics
Paralympic athletes with a vision impairment
Visually impaired category Paralympic competitors
Athletes (track and field) at the 2020 Summer Paralympics
20th-century Turkish people
21st-century Turkish people
Turkish blind people